The 1974 California Golden Bears football team was an American football team that represented the University of California, Berkeley in the Pacific-8 Conference (Pac-8) during the 1974 NCAA Division I football season. In their third year under head coach Mike White, the Golden Bears compiled a 7–3–1 record (4–2–1 in Pac-8, tied for third), and outscored their opponents by a combined total of 276 to 213. The Pac-8 did not allow a second bowl team until the following season (1975).

The team's statistical leaders included Steve Bartkowski with 2,580 passing yards, Chuck Muncie with 791 rushing yards, and Steve Rivera with 938 receiving yards.

Schedule

NFL Draft
Three Golden Bears were selected in the 1975 NFL Draft; quarterback Steve Bartkowski was the first overall selection.

References

California
California Golden Bears football seasons
California Golden Bears football